Michael Evans (born 3 August 1946, in West Bromwich) is an English former footballer who played as a full back in the Football League for Walsall, Swansea City and Crewe Alexandra. He then played for a number of non-league clubs including Worcester City, Stourbridge, Stafford Rangers, Halesowen Town and Rushall Olympic, and has scouted for various Midlands clubs.

References

External links
 
 Profile at Walsall F.C.

1946 births
Living people
Sportspeople from West Bromwich
English footballers
Association football fullbacks
Walsall F.C. players
Swansea City A.F.C. players
Crewe Alexandra F.C. players
Worcester City F.C. players
Stourbridge F.C. players
Stafford Rangers F.C. players
Halesowen Town F.C. players
Rushall Olympic F.C. players
English Football League players